Mardekheh-ye Kuchek (also Romanized as Mardekheh-ye Kūchek; also known as Mardakha, Mardakheh, and Mardekheh) is a village in Tulem Rural District, Tulem District, Sowme'eh Sara County, Gilan Province, Iran. At the 2006 census, its population was 197, in 44 families.

References 

Populated places in Sowme'eh Sara County